Xyroptila uluru is a moth of the family Pterophoridae. It is found in western Australia.

Moths of Australia
Moths described in 2006
uluru